Lohsa station is a railway station in the municipality of Lohsa, located in the Bautzen district in Saxony, Germany.

References

Railway stations in Saxony
Buildings and structures in Bautzen (district)